New World Order is R&B/soul singer-songwriter Curtis Mayfield’s final studio album. The album got to No. 24 on the US Billboard Top R&B/Hip-Hop Albums chart and No. 44 on the UK Albums chart.

Critical reception

New World Order was the only Curtis Mayfield album written, recorded and released after a life-changing accident in August 1990 left him paralyzed from the neck down. Mayfield continued to compose and sing, and his vocals were recorded, usually line-by-line, while he was lying on his back.

AllMusic described the album as "a touching, moving comeback". Rolling Stone called the LP "a triumphant return".

New World Order was Grammy nominated for "Best R&B Album".
Both the album's title track and the song "Back to Living Again" were also Grammy nominated for "Best Male R&B Vocal Performance".

Singles
"New World Order" got to No. 14 on the Billboard Adult R&B Songs chart. "No One Knows About a Good Thing (You Don't Have to Cry)" also rose to No. 21 on the Billboard Adult R&B Songs chart.

Track listing

Personnel
Curtis Mayfield – vocals
Craig Love, Carlos Glover, Gary Thompson, Tomi Martin, Martin Terry – guitar
Charles Pettaway, Preston Crump, Ralphe Armstrong, Ralph Stacey, George Grier, Lebrian Scott – bass
Mavis Staples

Charts

Weekly charts

Year-end charts

References

Curtis Mayfield albums
1997 albums
Warner Records albums
Albums produced by Curtis Mayfield
Albums produced by Narada Michael Walden